The state of Haryana in North India has a vast road network with 34 National Highways (NH) with a total length of 2,484 km, 11 Expressways (including 3 National Expressways), State Highways (SH) with a total length of 1,801 km, major district roads (MDR) with a length of 1,395 km and other district roads with a length of 26,022 km (2016).

List of National Highways in Haryana

 National Highway 105 (India)
 National Highway 11 (India)
 National Highway 148A (India)
 National Highway 148B (India)
 National Highway 148N (India)
 National Highway 152 (India)
 National Highway 152A (India)
 National Highway 152D (India)  
 National Highway 248A (India) 
 National Highway 248BB (India)
 National Highway 254 (India)
 National Highway 334B (India)
 National Highway 334D (India)
 National Highway 344 (India)
 National Highway 352 (India)
 National Highway 352A (India)
 National Highway 352R (India)
 National Highway 352W (India)
 National Highway 44 (India)
 National Highway 444A (India)
 National Highway 48 (India)
 National Highway 5 (India)
 National Highway 52 (India)
 National Highway 54 (India)
 National Highway 7 (India)
 National Highway 703 (India)
 National Highway 709 (India)
 National Highway 709A (India)
 National Highway 709AD (India)
 National Highway 9 (India)
 National Highway 907 (India)
 National Highway 907G (India)
 National Highway 919 (India)
 Kaithal Pundri Karnal Highway

State Highways (SH) 

The state highways are arterial routes of a state, linking district headquarters and important towns within the state and connecting them with national highways or Highways of the neighboring states.

Major District Roads (MDR)

Other District Roads (ODR)

 
Haryana also has at least 11,216 km other district roads (ODR), also known as the village roads.

Expressways 

Following expressways, also called e-ways, pass through Haryana.

See also
 List of National Highways in India by highway number
 Railway in Haryana
 Airports in Haryana
 Divisions of Haryana

References

External links
 Multi-model transport network map of Haryana, created by Haryana Space Applications Centre, Hisar (HARSAC)
 Road network of Haryana, created by HARSAC
 Haryana PWD Site

State Highways
 
Haryana State Highways
State Highways